Yee-Sin Leo  (born ) is a Singaporean physician. Leo is the executive director of the National Centre for Infectious Diseases and researches emerging infectious diseases. She has  been in charge of Singapore's response to several outbreaks, including Nipah, SARS and COVID-19. In 2020, she was selected as one of the BBC's top 100 Women.

Early life 
Leo earned her undergraduate degree at the National University of Singapore. She earned her master's of medicine in 1989. She was a medical registrar at Tan Tock Seng Hospital. As a young doctor, Leo was interested in immunology, but after a chance encounter with infectious disease specialist David Allen she became more interested in infectious diseases. She was one of the first doctors to be trained in infectious diseases in Singapore.

Research and career 
In 1992 Leo worked as a clinical fellow in Los Angeles, where over half of her workload was HIV cases. When she returned to Singapore she established the country's first HIV programme and patient care centre. Her first frontline experience with infectious diseases were when the Nipah virus infected Singapore in 1999.

In 2002 Leo was made a Senior Consultant in the National Centre for Infectious Diseases. She has led the country through Middle East respiratory syndrome (MERS), Influenza A virus subtype H7N9 (bird flu) and Dengue fever outbreaks. Leo said that her experiences dealing with the struggles of severe acute respiratory syndrome (SARS) had served her in good stead for taking on COVID-19.

During the COVID-19 pandemic, Leo was cited in the Singapore press telling people that they did not have to wear masks if they did not have symptoms of respiratory infection.

In the preparations for the Global Health Summit hosted by the European Commission and the G20 in May 2021, Leo co-chaired the event's High Level Scientific Panel.

Personal life 
Leo is married to a biotechnology specialist. Together they have three children.

Awards and honours 

 2014 Red Ribbon Award
 2016 National Healthcare Group Distinguished Senior Clinician Award
 2020 Fortune magazine World's Greatest Leaders
 2020 100 Women (BBC)

Selected publications

References 

Living people
Year of birth missing (living people)
Singaporean women scientists
Singaporean infectious disease physicians
National University of Singapore alumni
Coronavirus researchers
BBC 100 Women